Cult of the Lamb is a roguelike video game developed by indie developer Massive Monster and published by Devolver Digital. The game was released on 11 August 2022 for macOS, Nintendo Switch, PlayStation 4, PlayStation 5, Windows, Xbox One, and Xbox Series X/S. The game follows a possessed lamb who is saved from death by a god-like stranger named "The One Who Waits", and must repay their debt by creating a loyal following in its name.

Cult of the Lamb received generally positive reviews from critics upon release, with praise directed towards its gameplay and replay value. It received three nominations at the 19th British Academy Games Awards, including Best Game.

Gameplay 
Cult of the Lamb is centred around a possessed lamb that is tasked with forming a cult to appease the ominous deity who saved the player character's life. The player must launch roguelike-style crusades and venture out into the game's five regions to defeat enemies and grow their following. The world, which is randomly generated and contains roguelike elements, contains resources to gather, perks and weapons to collect, enemies in the form of rival cultists and non-believers to fight, and other animals to rescue; these animals can be indoctrinated into the player's cult. They have appearances that can be changed and both positive and negative traits, which can affect how they act in the cult or how they react to the player's actions regarding the cult.

The player can manage their followers at their cult's village. Followers can be assigned tasks at the base such as gathering resources, building structures, worshipping, performing rituals, sending them to assist the player in battle, or sacrificing them, which can affect the player's abilities and the cult itself. The player must ensure their followers' needs are met by performing sermons and rituals to reinforce their faith, cooking food for them to survive, providing them with shelter, and ensuring the village is clean and sanitary. Otherwise, the followers can turn against the player, spread dissent, and eventually leave the cult with other followers; to prevent this, the player can provide for them, give them gifts, reeducate them, or detain them in a pillory until they stop dissenting.

Twitch integration 
The game integrates with the streaming website Twitch, via the "Companion of the Lamb" Twitch extension. Viewers can customize their follower by entering via a "Follower Raffle", which (when chosen at random) will have their username displayed above their character at all times. Other benefits is the "Twitch Totem Bar" where viewers can contribute channel points to, resulting in a random reward for the player, and a "Help or Hinder" event where they can vote on either help or hinder the player's progress.

Plot 
In a land of false prophets, a Lamb, supposedly the last of their kind, is brought before The Four Bishops of the Old Faith, and is sacrificed before them. Upon dying, The Lamb is brought before "The One Who Waits,” a strange deity who is imprisoned in chains. The One Who Waits tasks The Lamb with starting a cult in its name, gives The Lamb a demonic crown, then resurrects them.

Assisted by Ratau, The Lamb's precursor, The Lamb then settles at the ruins of a temple and begins establishing a cult on behalf of The One Who Waits, in order to defeat the four other Bishops – Leshy, Heket, Kallamar, and Shamura – and free it. After settling down into their cult, The Lamb adventures off on crusades, defeating each of the Four Bishops while simultaneously expanding the cult with followers, increasing its influence and The Lamb’s powers. With the death of each Bishop, one of the four chains holding The One Who Waits breaks, ultimately freeing the deity. While crusading, the Four Bishops and The One Who Waits speak to The Lamb in different encounters.

As The Lamb progressively gets closer to their ultimate goal, The One Who Waits informs The Lamb that the Four Bishops had betrayed and imprisoned him, and that he intends to ultimately rule the cult and the world while remaking them in his image. However, during The Lamb’s crusade against Shamura, Shamura reveals the identity of The One Who Waits: “Narinder.” Shamura also informs The Lamb that not only was Narinder the Fifth Bishop of the Old Faith, but was also their brother and equal, having ruled over the realm of Death. Shamura laments to The Lamb, confessing that millennia before, Narinder had grown ambitious and was discontent with his role as a Bishop. Shamura, blinded by their love for Narinder, had tried to help him by teaching him ideas of change, although Shamura's teachings were "most unnatural" for Narinder, as Shamura stated. Ultimately, Narinder betrayed the Bishops, which forced Shamura and the others to imprison him. Before the final battle, Shamura warns The Lamb that Narinder will come for them when all of the Bishops are dead.

After Shamura is defeated, The One Who Waits instructs The Lamb to visit him in his realm to return the demonic crown and to be sacrificed in his name. With the help of their followers, The Lamb opens the final gateway and goes before The One Who Waits. The Lamb is then instructed to kneel and be sacrificed in front of their followers, so that The One Who Waits can retake his crown and obtain his place as god of the world. The player is then given the option to sacrifice themselves to fulfill the prophecy or reject doing so.
If the player accepts, The One Who Waits is freed, and subsequently tortures The Lamb before killing it, ending the game. 

If the player refuses, a final battle ensues between The Lamb and The One Who Waits’s followers, Baal and Aym. Once the followers are defeated, The One Who Waits attempts to kill The Lamb himself. After the first defeat, The One Who Waits taunts The Lamb and transforms while pulling The Lamb into a hellscape, attempting to kill them in front of their followers a second time. If The Lamb defeats The One Who Waits again, it is stripped of its powers and transforms into a follower-like creature named Narinder. Narinder then admits defeat and begrudges The Lamb, and the player is given the option to spare Narinder or murder him. If the player chooses to kill Narinder, Narinder claims that The Lamb is no different than he was before he is subsequently killed. However, if the player chooses to spare Narinder, Narinder can be indoctrinated into the cult as an immortal follower, and insults The Lamb for being weak. Either option results in The Lamb's followers being rescued and The Lamb returning to their cult, and the game ends.

Development 
Cult of the Lamb is developed by Massive Monster, an Australian independent game development studio that has also created The Adventure Pals, Never Give Up, and Unicycle Giraffe. Additional funding for development was provided through VicScreen's Victorian Production Fund. Cult of the Lamb was officially announced at Gamescom in August 2021 and was released on 11 August 2022.

Free major post-release content updates to the game have been planned.

Reception

Critical response 
Cult of the Lamb received "generally favourable" reviews, according to review aggregator Metacritic. GameSpot praised the combat, calling it "fast-paced, fluid and fun" while also being surprised by the amount of customization and player-choice which in turns makes the game "very replayable". Nintendo Life liked the variety present in the dungeon crawling, writing, "New layouts and equipment loadouts keep every run unique, while its intense and chaotic battles demand your full attention". Destructoid felt the game tutorialized its mechanics properly, "Again, for all of the elements that come into play, Cult of the Lamb presents everything in a digestible way". PC Gamer compared the game to the Animal Crossing series, saying it's like "if Tom Nook craved power instead of money", and enjoyed the ways in which the player could manage their cult, writing that it could be complicated, "but it never threatens to be overwhelming". IGN praised the way it balanced macabre themes with "cutesy cartoon vibes".

While enjoying the premise, Game Informer criticized how difficult it was to find time to customize the cult, "with so many cosmetic items thrown into the formula, I was disappointed by how rarely I was afforded the time to focus on them". The Washington Post disliked the combat, feeling that it often devolved into a jumbled mess, "the game's 2.5D perspective would make it difficult to gauge where you are even if you weren’t constantly sliding all over the battlefield". Polygon liked the characters that the player could find in dungeons, saying that they were "genuinely interesting, with their backstories mostly obfuscated and enhanced by their charming picture book-esque designs". Eurogamer praised the art style of the game, noting that it looked like "the best New Yorker cartoon".

Sales 
Cult of the Lamb sold one million units within its first week of release.

Accolades

References

External links 

2022 video games
Action-adventure games
Construction and management simulation games
Dark fantasy video games
Devolver Digital games
Dungeon crawler video games
Farming video games
Fictional sheep
Golden Joystick Award winners
Indie video games
Life simulation games
MacOS games
Nintendo Switch games
PlayStation 4 games
PlayStation 5 games
Roguelike video games
Single-player video games
Video games about animals
Video games about cults
Video games about Satanism
Video games developed in Australia
Windows games
Xbox One games
Xbox Series X and Series S games
Video games with alternate endings